Roscoe Blevel Ates (January 20, 1895 – March 1, 1962) was an American vaudeville performer, actor of stage and screen, comedian and musician who primarily featured in western films and television. He was best known as western character Soapy Jones. He was also billed as Rosco Ates.

Early years
Ates was born on January 20, 1895, in the northwest of Hattiesburg, Mississippi, in the rural hamlet of Grange (Grange is no longer included on road maps). Ates spent much of his childhood learning how to manage a speech impediment,<ref name=allmov>{{cite web|url=http://www.allmovie.com/cg/avg.dll?p=avg&sql=2:2680|title=Roscoe Ates": Biography by Hal Erickson|publisher=allmovie.com|access-date=March 1, 2009}}</ref> succeeding when he was 18.

 Early career 
Ates played violin to accompany silent films at a theater in Chickasha, Oklahoma. Following that experience, he became an entertainer as a concert violinist but found economic opportunities greater as a vaudeville comedian, appearing as half of the team of Ates and Darling. For 15 years, he was a headliner on the Orpheum Circuit, and he revived his long-gone stutter for humorous effect

 Military service 
Ates served in World War II, training of the Air Force fighter squad program in Houston, Texas at Ellington Field Texas.

Theater and personal appearances
On Broadway, Ates appeared as James McCracken in the musical comedy Sea Legs (1937).

In the late 1930s, Ates made a personal appearance tour in Scotland and England. He also toured selected American cities with Hollywood Scandals, a stage revue with 35 people.

Film career
His first film role was a ship's cook in South Sea Rose. The next year he was cast as "Old Stuff" in the widescreen film Billy the Kid starring Wallace Beery. Here is a partial listing of his films:Check and Double Check (1930) as Brother ArthurCimarron (1931) as Jesse RickeyThe Champ (1931) as SpongePolitics (1931) as Peter Higgins, the town barberCome on Danger! (1932)Renegades of the West (1932) as Dr. Henry FawcettFreaks (1932)The Roadhouse Murder (1932)Lucky Devils (1933)What! No Beer? (1933) as Schultz the BrewmasterAlice in Wonderland (1933) as FishFair Exchange (1936) as Elmer GoodgeGod's Country and the Woman (1937) as Gander HopkinsThe Great Adventures of Wild Bill Hickok (1938) as Oscar "Snake-Eyes" SmithGone with the Wind (1939) as a convalescing Confederate soldier. While scratching his back on a tent pole, he utters the line "These animules is driving me crazy!"Three Texas Steers (1939) as Sheriff BrownThe Cowboy from Sundown (1940) as Deputy Gloomy DayCaptain Caution (1940)Chad Hanna (1940)Bad Men of Missouri (1941) as LafeSullivan's Travels (1941)
 I'll Sell My Life (1941)The Palm Beach Story (1942)West to Glory (1947)Wild Country (1947)Check Your Guns (1948)The Hawk of Powder River (1948)

Musical performances
Ates performed these songs in his films:Billy the Kid: "Turkey in the Straw" (1930)Remote Control: "The Wedding March" (1930)Renegades of the West: "Farmer in the Dell" (1932)Rancho Grande: "Dude Ranch Cow Hands" (uncredited, 1938)Cowboy from Sundown: "The Craw-dad Song" (1940)Captain Caution: "Hilda" (1940)Colorado Serenade: "Home on the Range" (1946)Driftin' River: "Way Back in Oklahoma" (1946)Wild West, also known as Prairie Outlaw: Song, "Elmer, The Knock-Kneed Cowboy" (1946)

Television career
In 1950, Ates appeared in his first television role as Deputy Roscoe on ABC series The Marshal of Gunsight Pass.Ates appeared on television in multiple roles. He was cast as Henry Wilson in the episode "The Census Taker" of the syndicated western series The Cisco Kid, and he also appeared that same year in the Gale Storm sitcom, My Little Margie and Boston Blackie. He appeared on Gail Davis's Annie Oakley series as Curly Dawes, the telegraph operator.

In 1958, Ates was cast as "Old Timer" in the episode "The Sacramento Story" of NBC's Wagon Train. In 1959, Ates appeared in western series The Restless Gun, State Trooper, and Buckskin. He had a nameless role as a barfly in the 1958 episode of "Maverick" called "Gun-Shy", a spoof of the series Gunsmoke.  In 1960, he was cast as Fenton in the episode "Hot Ice Cream" of Charles Bronson's ABC series Man with a Camera, as Lou Nugget in "The Fabulous Fiddle" of Scott Brady's syndicated Shotgun Slade, and as Deputy Boak in "The Missing Queen" of Andrew Duggan's ABC crime drama Bourbon Street Beat, set in New Orleans.

Later roles

From 1958–60, Ates appeared five times on CBS's Alfred Hitchcock Presents mystery series.

In 1960, Ates appeared as a guest in the presentation of the life story of honorary Hollywood mayor Johnny Grant on NBC's This Is Your Life biography series with host Ralph Edwards.

Ates's last credited roles were in 1961 as a drunk in Robert Stack's ABC series The Untouchables and as sheriffs in The Red Skelton Show. His final screen appearance in Jerry Lewis's 1961 film The Errand Boy'' was uncredited.

Family and death

Ates was married three times. After his divorce from the former Clara Callahan, he married Leonore Belle Jumps in 1949. She died in 1955. In December 1960, Ates married model Beatrice Heisser.

Ates died of lung cancer at the age of 67 at the West Valley Community Hospital in Encino, California. He is entombed at Forest Lawn Memorial Park in Glendale, California.

References

External links

1895 births
1962 deaths
Male actors from Mississippi
American male film actors
American male television actors
American male violinists
Deaths from lung cancer in California
People from Greater Los Angeles
Musicians from Hattiesburg, Mississippi
Male Western (genre) film actors
Burials at Forest Lawn Memorial Park (Glendale)
20th-century American male actors
Vaudeville performers
20th-century American singers
20th-century American violinists
20th-century American male singers
United States Army Air Forces personnel of World War II